Azul y Blanco (Spanish for 'Blue and White') was a weekly newspaper published from Matagalpa, Nicaragua, covering international news. As of 1909 Samuel Moya served as director and editor of the newspaper.

References

Defunct newspapers published in Nicaragua
Defunct weekly newspapers
Weekly newspapers published in Nicaragua
Spanish-language newspapers
Matagalpa